The mayor of Veliko Tarnovo is the head of Veliko Tarnovo Municipality. The current mayor is Daniel Panov.

List of mayors of Veliko Tarnovo

See also 

 List of mayors of Sofia
 List of mayors of Plovdiv
 List of mayors of Pleven
 List of mayors of Varna

References 

Veliko Tarnovo